Zedlitz or von Zedlitz may refer to:
 Zedlitz, municipality in the district of Greiz, in Thuringia, Germany

People with the name
 Franz von Zedlitz und Leipe (1876–1944), German Freiherr and sport shooter
 George William von Zedlitz (1871–1949), New Zealand professor of modern languages
 Hans von Zedlitz (1890–1948), German film actor
 Joseph Christian Freiherr von Zedlitz (1790–1862), Austrian dramatist and epic poet
 Karl Abraham Zedlitz (1731–1793), Prussian minister of education